Lily Alice Lefevre (5April 185417October 1938) was a Canadian writer whose literary work closely linked her to her hometown of Vancouver. Her book of poems Lion's Gate and Other Verses (1895) was the first book written by a woman and published by a British Columbia publisher, Province Publishing. She was born in Kingston, Ontario. As a teenager she received a medal for writing the best poem about a carnival in Montreal, which continued to be a theme in many of her later poems.

Lefevre arrived in Vancouver in 1886 with her husband, a CPR district surgeon Dr. John Lefevre. Her husband died in 1906. In 1889, the title poem of her book first appeared in The Vancouver Daily World as The Lions' Gateway, and was published under her pen name, Fleurange. One of Lefevre's sonnets was published in a book of poetry edited by Lord Dufferin who was Governor General of Canada from 1872 to 1878.

Lefevre organized the Imperial Order of the Daughters of the Empire upon the occasion of the coronation of King Edward VII in 1902. She was co-founder of the Vancouver Art Gallery. In 1934 she donated $5,000 for a scholarship and gold medal to the University of British Columbia in honor of and to commemorate her husband J.M. Lefevre. Her book The Lion's Gate was first published in 1895, but was re-launched in 1903 along with The Beaver and the Empress. In 1936, it was again re-printed for the 50th anniversary of the founding of the city of Vancouver. In 1921, A Garden By The Sea appeared. Her poem March on! Canada! was set to music by Harold Craxton.

Works
 The Lions' Gate And Other Verses, (1895)
 The Lions' Gate; and, The Beaver And The Empress, (1903)
 A Garden By The Sea, And Other Poems, (1921)

Source:

Anthologies
Works by Lefevre are included in these books:

 Garvin, Canadian Verse for Boys and Girls, (1930)
 Lighthall, Canadian Poems and Lays, (c1892) 
 Lighthall, Songs of the Great Dominion, (1889)
 Rand, Treasury of Canadian Verse, (1900)

References

External links 
 
The Lions' Gate and Other Verses Early Canadiana Online

1854 births
1938 deaths
Canadian women poets
Writers from Kingston, Ontario
19th-century Canadian poets
19th-century Canadian women writers